Frank William Wood (April 10, 1942 – May 22, 2005), better known as Eagle Bill Amato, was a Cherokee marijuana medicine man known for popularizing the vaporizer, mostly used for vaporizing cannabis and promoting the use of medical marijuana. Eagle Bill is also the inventor of the first popular portable vaporizer called the Eagle Bill Shake & Vape. He was born in Cleveland, Ohio.

References

Notes

Sources

External links
 Official site
 Eagle Bill on Myspace
 Eagle Bill Vaporizer Review

People from Cleveland
American cannabis activists
1942 births
2005 deaths